The 1949 Sugar Bowl to the Sugar Bowl featured the third-ranked North Carolina Tar Heels and the fifth-ranked Oklahoma Sooners.

In the first quarter, Oklahoma scored on a 1-yard Mitchell touchdown run as the Sooners jumped out to a 7–0 lead. North Carolina answered with a 2-yard touchdown run from Rodgers as the score became 7–6. In the third quarter, Oklahoma scored on an 8-yard touchdown run from Pearson. Oklahoma won the game, 14–6. Oklahoma's "General" Jack Mitchell was named Sugar Bowl MVP.

References

Sugar Bowl
Sugar Bowl
North Carolina Tar Heels football bowl games
Oklahoma Sooners football bowl games
Sugar Bowl
Sugar Bowl